The Ursula Frayne Catholic College is a dual-campus independent Roman Catholic co-educational primary and secondary day school, located southeast of Perth, Western Australia.

The college was established in its present form in 1990, but dates back to a school founded by the Sisters of Mercy, led by Mother Clare Buggy, in 1899. The school was named after Mother Ursula Frayne to publicly commemorate the first leader of the Sisters of Mercy and founder of many Catholic schools in Western Australia.

History 
A group of the Sisters of Mercy, led by Mother Clare Buggy, arrived from Northern Ireland in 1899 and created their first school in the current place of the Duncan street campus, naming it St. Joachim's School. Our Lady Help of Christians School was built in the areas of East Victoria in 1936 to supply education for newcomers to the suburb. In the 1950s, the Archbishop noticed that a boys' school had not yet been built in the south-east suburbs of Perth and so he asked the Congregation of Christian Brothers in Sydney for help, while the East Victorian Parish donated land worth around £2,000. St. Francis Xavier College was finally finished in 1953 and was staffed by the Christian Brothers.

However, with declining enrolments at Xavier College, the college united with Our Lady Help of Christians School, and soon afterwards, amalgamated with St. Joachim's School to become Ursula Frayne Catholic College.

Notable alumni 
 Phillip George Pendal, a Liberal politician

Sister Martin Kelly MBE student St Joachim's School 1939 to 1947 then Administrator Catherine McAuley Centre. Died 11th July 1987.

See also 

 List of schools in the Perth metropolitan area
 Catholic education in Australia

References

External links 
 Ursula Frayne Catholic College Website

Catholic primary schools in Perth, Western Australia
Sisters of Mercy schools
Catholic secondary schools in Perth, Western Australia
1990 establishments in Australia
Educational institutions established in 1990